Sympistis pachet is a moth of the family Noctuidae first described by James T. Troubridge in 2008. It is found in the US state of Nevada.

The wingspan is about 29 mm.

References

pachet
Moths described in 2008